

Events
Wolfgang Amadeus Mozart travels to Berlin.
Joseph Haydn meets Maria Anna von Genzinger.
Adalbert Gyrowetz arrives in Paris.
Luigi Cherubini becomes music director for the Théâtre Monsieur.
Wilhelm Friedrich Ernst Bach becomes Kapellmeister at Berlin.
Anna Storace appears in a London production of Giovanni Paisiello's Il Barbiere di Siviglia.
Mozart writes to his fellow Freemason and benefactor, Puchberg, saying that next time they meet, he will tell him about Antonio Salieri’s plots "which, however, have completely failed".
Ignaz Joseph Pleyel becomes Kapellmeister of Strasbourg Cathedral in succession to Franz Xaver Richter.

Classical Music
Ludwig van Beethoven – Two Preludes through all twelve major keys for piano, Op. 39
William Hamilton Bird – The Oriental Miscellany
William Crotch – The Captivity of Judah (oratorio)
Carl Ditters von Dittersdorf – String Quintet in G major, Kr.190
Jean-Louis Duport – 6 Cello Sonatas, Op. 4
Jan Ladislav Dussek – Piano Sonatas No. 4–6, Op. 10
John Gunn – 40 Favorite Scotch Airs for Violin, Flute, or Cello
Joseph Haydn 
Symphony No. 92 in G, "Oxford"
Fantasia in C major, Hob.XVII:4
Leopold Anton Kozeluch – Concerto for Clarinet no 2 in E flat major
Wolfgang Amadeus Mozart 
Clarinet Quintet in A
Un moto di gioia mi sento, K.579
Vasilj Alekseevič Paškevič – Muzyka operyi Komitscheskoi Fewej
Ignaz Pleyel 
String Quintet in F major, B.285
3 Flute Quartets, B.381–383
6 Violin Duos, B.513–518
Karl Leopold Röllig – Kleine Tonstücke für die Glasharmonika
Daniel Gottlob Türk – Klaviersonaten, größtenteils für Kenner
Giovanni Battista Viotti – Violin Concerto No.16 in E minor

Opera
Domenico Cimarosa – I Due Baroni
André Grétry – Raoul Barbe-Bleue
Jean-Baptiste Lemoyne – Nephté
Giovanni Paisiello – Nina
Johann Friedrich Reichardt – Brenno; Claudine von Villa Bella
Antonio Salieri – Il Pastor fido; La Cifra; both with libretto by Lorenzo Da Ponte
Stephen Storace – The Haunted Tower
Paul Wranitzky – Oberon, König der Elfen

Methods and theory writings 

 André Grétry – Mémoires, ou essai sur la musique
 John Gunn – The Theory and Practice of Fingering the Violoncello
 Manuel da Paixão Ribeiro – Nova arte de viola
 Luigi Antonio Sabbatini – Elementi teorici della musica
 Daniel Gottlob Türk 
 Klavierscule
 Von den wichtigsten Pflichten eines Organisten

Births
January 30 – George Augustus Kollmann, composer
February 1 – Hippolyte André Jean Baptiste Chélard, composer (d. 1861)
February 8 – Ludwig Wilhelm Maurer, composer (d. 1878)
February 15 – Friedrich Fesca, composer (d. 1826)
May 24  – Cathinka Buchwieser, German opera singer and actress (d.1828)
June 27 – Friedrich Silcher, composer (d. 1860)
September 1 – Franz Anton Adam Stockhausen, composer
October 18 – Giovanni Tadolini, composer
October 24 – Ramon Carnicer y Batlle, composer (d. 1855)
October 26 – Joseph Mayseder
October 28 – Johann Schneider, composer
November 13 – Martin de Ron, composer
December 8 – John Fawcett, composer (d. 1867)
December 14 – Maria Agata Szymanowska, composer (d. 1831)

Deaths
January 1 – Christleib Siegmund Binder, composer
January 2 – Franz Joseph Leonti Meyer von Schavensee, composer
January 20 – Johann Christoph Oley, composer
February 2 – Armand-Louis Couperin, organist and composer (b. 1727)
May 10 – Guillaume Gommaire Kennis, composer
May 12 – Robert Bremner, music collector and publisher (born 1713)
June 7 – Václav Jan Kopřiva (b. 1708)
June 14 – Johann Wilhelm Hertel, composer (b. 1727)
July 4 – Cláudio Manuel da Costa, poet and conductor (b. 1729)
July 15 – Jacques Duphly, composer (b. 1715)
September 11 – Luka Sorkočević, composer (b. 1734) (suicide)
September 12 – Franz Xaver Richter, composer (b. 1709)
October 24 – Joaquin de Oxinaga, composer
date unknown 
Minette, actress, singer and dancer (b. 1767) (killed in Haitian race riot) 
Andreas Lidl, British composer (born c. 1740)

 
18th century in music
Music by year